Bohol's 2nd congressional district is one of the three congressional districts of the Philippines in the province of Bohol. It has been represented in the House of Representatives of the Philippines since 1916 and earlier in the Philippine Assembly from 1907 to 1916. The district consists of the northern municipalities of Bien Unido, Buenavista, Clarin, Dagohoy, Danao, Getafe, Inabanga, President Carlos P. Garcia, Sagbayan, San Isidro, San Miguel, Talibon, Trinidad and Ubay. It is currently represented in the 19th Congress by Vanessa Aumentado of the People's Reform Party (PRP).

Representation history

Election results

2019

2016

2013

2010

See also
Legislative districts of Bohol

References

Congressional districts of the Philippines
Politics of Bohol
1907 establishments in the Philippines
Congressional districts of Central Visayas
Constituencies established in 1907